Jerry H. Bilik (born October 7, 1933 in New Rochelle, New York, United States) is an American composer, arranger, songwriter, conductor, and director of stage productions.

Bilik studied with Tibor Serly who had been a student of Béla Bartók. He received a B.M.E. degree and a M.M. degree from the University of Michigan, which counts Bilik among its notable alumni.

Bilik composed Symphony for Band, in 1971, which he dedicated to Serly and published in 1972. He also composed the "M Fanfare."

He has served as Vice President of creative development for Disney on Ice.

References

External links

Jerry Bilik Music website - maintained by Jerry Bilik

1933 births
20th-century classical composers
21st-century classical composers
American male classical composers
American classical composers
Living people
Musicians from New Rochelle, New York
University of Michigan School of Music, Theatre & Dance alumni
21st-century American composers
20th-century American composers
Classical musicians from New York (state)
20th-century American male musicians
21st-century American male musicians